Sébastien Descons (born 13 May 1983) is a French rugby union player. His position is Scrum-half and he currently plays for Racing Métro 92 in the Top 14. He began his career with USA Perpignan, playing just seven games in two seasons before dropping down to Section Paloise in the Pro D2. He joined Racing Métro in 2011.

References

1983 births
Living people
French rugby union players
Sportspeople from Ariège (department)
Racing 92 players
Rugby union scrum-halves